Sphallotrichus sericeotomentosus is a species of beetle in the family Cerambycidae. It was described by S. A. Fragoso in 1995. It is known from Venezuela, Brazil, and Bolivia.

References

Cerambycini
Beetles described in 1995